Zuleika Soler Aragón (born June 29, 1994) is a Salvadoran model and beauty pageant titleholder who was crowned Reinado de El Salvador 2019. She represented El Salvador at the Miss Universe 2019.

Personal life
Soler was born on June 29, 1994, in La Unión, El Salvador to a Salvadoran mother and a Puerto Rican father  and was raised in New Jersey. In 2018, she obtained her bachelor's degree in communications and public relations from Kean University.

Pageantry
Soler first participated at Miss El Salvador Latina 2016, where she was crowned as Miss El Salvador Latina 2016 in San Salvador, gaining the right to represent her country at Miss América Latina del Mundo 2016 held at Gran Teatro Palenque in Riviera Maya, Mexico and placed as a Top 10 semi-finalist.

She continued her pageantry career as she represented La Unión at the Reinado de El Salvador 2019 pageant and was crowned the title of Miss Universe El Salvador 2019 during the coronation night held on July 20, 2019, Soler will now represent El Salvador at Miss Universe 2019 after her victory. She succeeded outgoing Miss Universe El Salvador 2018 Marisela de Montecristo.

References

External links

1994 births
Living people
Miss El Salvador winners
Miss Universe 2019 contestants
Salvadoran beauty pageant winners
Salvadoran female models
American people of Salvadoran descent
American female models
Female models from New Jersey
Kean University alumni
Hispanic and Latino American female models
American people of Puerto Rican descent